Dragon Quest VII: Fragments of the Forgotten Past is a 2000 Japanese role-playing video game developed by Heartbeat and ArtePiazza, and published by Enix for the PlayStation. It was released in North America in 2001 under the title Dragon Warrior VII. The game received a remake on the Nintendo 3DS in Japan in 2013, released in English under the title Dragon Quest VII: Fragments of the Forgotten Past in 2016. A version of the game for Android and iOS was released in Japan in 2015.

Dragon Quest VII: Fragments of the Forgotten Past is the seventh installment of the popular Dragon Quest series of role playing games, and is the successor to 1995's Dragon Quest VI for the Super Famicom. An immediate success upon release, Dragon Warrior VIIs sales totalled 4.06 million by April 6, 2001, making it the best-selling PlayStation game in Japan, and is an Ultimate Hits title. It was the first main series Dragon Quest title to be released outside Japan since the release of Dragon Quest IV in North America in 1992, the last Dragon Quest title to be released in North America with the Dragon Warrior name, and the last Dragon Quest game outside of Japan to be published by Enix, before merging with Squaresoft in 2003 to form Square Enix. The game was produced by Yuji Horii, who has presided over the Dragon Quest series since its inception. Artwork and character designs were once again provided by Dragon Ball creator Akira Toriyama, the artist responsible for all previous Dragon Quest games.

The game follows the Hero and his friends as they discover secrets about the mysterious islands surrounding their home of Estard. Through some ancient ruins, they are transported to the pasts of various islands and must defeat evil in each new location. Game mechanics are largely unchanged from previous games in the series, although an extensive Class system allows players to customize their characters.

 Gameplay 

Dragon Quest VII is best known for its huge size. Without completing the game's side quests, a single game of Dragon Quest VII can take a hundred hours or more. In terms of gameplay, not much has changed from previous installments; battles are still fought in a turn-based mode from a first person perspective. Although non-battle sequences are rendered in 3D, battles themselves are still portrayed two dimensionally. The ability to talk with the party characters in and outside of battles was added to this game. They offer advice about battle strategies and plot points, or simply comment on how they feel at a given moment. There are four ways and means of locomotion: walking (striding), sailing a boat, flying a magic carpet, or using an object known as the skystone. Each of these can move across different terrain; however, some are more limited than others.

The main flow of the game is different from the other Dragon Quest games; instead of exploring one large world, the party goes to separate continents by placing stone shards into their appropriate pedestals in Estard Fane. Once all of the missing shards are located and placed for a particular pedestal, the party is transported to the trapped location in the past. After solving whatever problems plague the location, the party then travels back to Estard, the beginning island. From there, they can travel via boat, carpet, or skystone to the modern version of the location they just saved. These saved lands appear on the main map, although the originals (from the past) can be revisited through the ruins.

Like most of the other Dragon Quest games, this game has several mini-games to participate in. The Immigrant Town, similar to the one in Dragon Quest IV, lets the player recruit people from various towns. They then live in the town, which changes depending on the type of people living there (e.g. several merchants will bring more stores to the town). A prominent feature in most Dragon Quest games is the casino. Poker, slot machines, and luck panel can all be played in Dragon Quest VII. The Ranking Association allows the player to compete for the highest stats, like the Beauty Competition from Dragon Quest VI. The player can also catch monsters, although they are only displayed in the Monster Park, unlike in Dragon Quest V, where monsters fought in the party. Blueprints are found to add new environments to the park.

 Class system 

Dragon Quest VII uses a class system for learning abilities, similar to that of Dragon Quest VI. Some available classes include Warrior, Fighter, Cleric, Mage, Bard, Dancer, Jester, Thief, Idol, Pirate, Ranger, Gladiator, Paladin, Summoner, God Hand ("Champion" in the localized 3DS version), and Hero, some of which are unlocked by mastering other classes. The game also includes monster classes, which can be unlocked by using the appropriate monster heart or mastering pre-requisite monster classes.

Characters generally stop learning character specific spells and skills around experience level 15; however, around this time in the game, players will reach Dharma Island, where they can give their characters certain classes. Each non-monster class belongs to one of three tiers (Basic, Intermediate, and Advanced), while monster classes have more tiers. Characters gain levels in classes by fighting a certain number of battles, as opposed to gaining experience points. Characters learn different spells and skills when they reach another class level and their stats are affected by what class they are. Once a character reaches the 8th and final level of a class, it is considered "mastered", if a character masters certain classes, higher tier classes will become available to them. For example, if a character masters the Mage and Cleric classes, which are both Basic, then the Intermediate class Sage will be available to them. If that character was to then master the Teen Idol class, the Advanced Summoner class would open up.

 Plot and setting 

 Story 

The two of them find a way to travel back to the past, when the continents still existed. The continents are facing serious problems that threaten their existence; the protagonist and his growing party work to resolve the problems, and when they do, the continents reappear in the present. When all the continents are finally restored, the party confronts the Demon Lord Orgodemir, who long ago defeated God (The Almighty in the 3DS English translation) and is responsible for the continents' disappearance. After his initial defeat, Orgodemir returns in the present and poses as God to trick humanity into worshiping him, then seals the continents away again. The party summons the Four Elemental Spirits to expose Orgodemir, then travels to the Dark Palace where they defeat Orgodemir in a final showdown.

 Characters 

  — The Hero has no default name; as is traditional in the Dragon Quest series, the name is supplied by the player (however, he is called Arus in the official manga and was given the name Auster in the 3DS English translation). The Hero is a lifelong native of the town of Fishbel (Pilchard Bay in the 3DS remake) on Estard Island. He is good friends with Maribel, daughter of the mayor of Fishbel, and Kiefer, prince of Estard Castle. In particular, he has a fondness for going out on impromptu "adventures" with Kiefer. It is one such adventure than begins the story of the game. In terms of gameplay, the Hero is a well-rounded character who is one of the strongest fighters in the game. He also lays claim to a variety of healing magics, and has fairly average statistical growth.
  — Kiefer is a prince of Estard, and the presumptive heir to the throne. Far from anticipating his elevation to kingship, however, Kiefer seems to resent his royal blood, and is a source of endless worry and frustration to his family and advisors. Kiefer, for his part, spends much of his time in search of excitement and adventure, and has found a kindred spirit in the Hero, whom he considers his closest friend. Kiefer is incredibly strong, with a high physical attack statistic and naturally high hit points (HP). He is the most powerful character available early on in the game. On one trip to an ancient land, Kiefer falls in love, and remains behind. Upon returning to the present, the hero finds out that Kiefer became a famous guardian of the Dejan tribe, and is the biological ancestor of almost an entire culture/continent. Kiefer is also the main character of the game Dragon Quest Monsters: Caravan Heart.
  known as Maribel Mayde in the 3DS English translation — A friend of both the Hero and Kiefer, Maribel is the daughter of the mayor of Fishbel. Unlike Kiefer, who has steadfastly refused to let his social status influence how he looks upon other people, Maribel tends to be a bit condescending, even bossy. Despite this, she has a kind, sentimental side and gets along well with her friends, and occasionally accompanies them on their adventuring, even if she sometimes has to pressure them into letting her tag along. Maribel is primarily a magic user: with low starting physical statistics, and an early lack of powerful weapons available for her use, it takes a good deal of time before she can do anything approaching the amount of physical damage inflicted by some of the other characters. On the other hand, Maribel has access to a variety of damaging attack spells relatively early on. She is forced to leave the party when her father falls ill, but unlike Kiefer, she can rejoin them later on.
  known as Ruff in the 3DS English translation — Although he appears normal, Gabo is actually a white wolf pup who was irrevocably turned into a boy. As such, he retains a number of obvious lupine characteristics, and can be somewhat animalistic at times. He agrees to travel with the heroes hoping to protect his family, but remains with the group out of a sense of loyalty. In contrast to Maribel, Gabo's specialty is in physical combat. Despite his diminutive size, he can easily become as powerful as the Hero, Melvin, and Aira through mastery of the class system.
  known as Mervyn in the 3DS English translation — A skilled paladin of generations past, Melvin fought on the side of God against the Demon Lord many years ago. Melvin excelled at his work, and distinguished himself in both skill and honor. As such, Melvin was petrified in stone by God, so that, should the need arise, he could be reawakened to once again take up the fight against evil. The party finds Melvin, who joins their adventure, although his age and unfamiliarity with the present day often leave other characters somewhat befuddled. Melvin is proficient at both magic and physical combat, though his magic casting abilities are slightly superior to his physical attack skills.
  known as Aishe''' in the 3DS English translation — Aira is the lead ritual dancer of the Deja tribe, an ancient race of people charged with the stewardship of a temple necessary in the act of calling forth God. Raised and trained at swordsmanship, Aira is a more than capable fighter, as well. But, for all her skills, Aira harbors a secret from her past that weighs heavily upon her soul. Aira is a powerful fighter and magic user. Although capable of doing both significant physical and significant magical damage, Aira stands in contrast to Melvin, in that her magic skills tend to lag slightly behind her physical statistics.

 Development and release Dragon Quest VII was designed by series creator Yuji Horii and directed by Manabu Yamana. Shintaro Majima signed on as art director, while series veterans Akira Toriyama and Koichi Sugiyama designed the characters and composed the music respectively. The game was officially announced in 1996 and originally planned for the Nintendo 64DD. On January 15, 1997, it was announced that development had been moved to the PlayStation. By the next day, both stock in Sony and Enix rose significantly in Japan. In turn, the move to the PlayStation was described as a "semi-crisis situation" for Nintendo of Japan, with Japanese stock analysts and industry observers losing faith in the long-term viability of the Nintendo 64 line. Enix cited the larger potential market and lower cost of manufacturing CDs as the reasons for the change of platform. By 2000, Dragon Quest VII was predicted to be so successful in Japan that it would "create a 50 billion yen effect on the Japanese economy", said research firm DIHS. Dragon Quest VII would go on to be released on August 26, 2000 and sold 4.06 million games in Japan alone, becoming one of the highest selling games of all time.

The game was delayed numerous times before its actual release. Work on the game was extended because the development staff wanted to perfect the game due to high expectations from the fans and because the team only consisted of about 35 people. Before its release, it was ranked as the most wanted game in Japan and Square, knowing about Dragon Quest VII's release, moved Final Fantasy IX to come out on a later date. Horii stated in an interview that the team focused more on puzzle solving than the game's story. Being the first game in the series to include 3D graphics, the team was also initially reluctant to include CG movies and cinematics due to letters written to Enix by fans fearing that doing so would change the overall feeling of the series.

The English language localization of Dragon Warrior VII began directly after the game's Japanese release. Enix of America was tasked with translating over 70,000 pages of text via 20 translators and 5 copy editors. No effort was made to edit or censor the context of the Japanese script. Weeks prior to the game's US release, Enix released new information about the game's different mechanics on their website weekly to introduce players to the game. Paul Handelman, president of Enix America, commented on the game that "All the talk this month about new systems with the latest technological wizardry doesn't diminish the fact that at the end of the day, compelling game play is what it's all about, and Dragon Warrior VII provides just that." Dragon Warrior VII was released in the US on November 1, 2001 and was the last game in the series to have Warrior in its title instead of Quest. In 2003, Square Enix registered the Dragon Quest trademark in the US, with the intent to retire the Dragon Warrior name. Soon after the game's release, developer Heartbeat went on hiatus. Justin Lucas, product manager of Enix America, commented on the hiatus, saying that the developer merely "worked their tails off on Dragon Warrior 7 and Dragon Warrior 4. They decided to take a sabbatical for a while and rest up", noting that it had nothing to do with the game's US sales.

The back of the Dragon Warrior VII manual in North America contained an advertisement for Dragon Warrior IV, an enhanced remake for the PlayStation of a Nintendo game of the same name. The localization was later cancelled, due to Heartbeat's closure.

 Remake 

On October 30, 2012 Square Enix announced that they were remaking Dragon Quest VII exclusively for the Nintendo 3DS and that it would be released in Japan in February 2013. Later that day, Square Enix confirmed that the release date would be February 7, 2013 for Japan. Similarly to Dragon Quest IX, the game features visible enemy encounters instead of random encounters, unique backgrounds and enemies that have individual attack characteristics. The remake was originally not intended for a release outside of Japan, in part due to the sheer cost and time needed to localize the game's substantial content. After numerous letters from core Dragon Quest fans in France, as well as Square Enix and Nintendo executives, the decision was made to release the 3DS port worldwide. In the November 2015 Nintendo Direct, it was shown that Dragon Quest VII would be coming outside Japan in 2016, with the new subtitle Fragments of the Forgotten Past. The international release of the 3DS remake contained a completely retranslated script which followed the localization style of games since Square Enix's release of Dragon Quest VIII in 2005, including numerous name and terminology changes for characters from the original Dragon Warrior VII release. The Western release also replaced the orchestral score from the Japanese release with the synthesized MIDI soundtrack that had been used in the Japan-only iOS and Android versions of the game, released in 2015.

 Other media 

 Soundtrack 

As with nearly every Dragon Quest game, Koichi Sugiyama composed the musical score. As was done for Dragon Quest VI, the original sound version was bundled with the symphonic suite in a two-disc set called Dragon Quest VII: Eden no Senshitachi Symphonic Suite + OST. The entire first disc and the opening track of the second disc consists of the symphonic suite, while the rest of the second disc is the original sound version. The Symphonic Suite was released alone on Super Audio CD later that year, and re-released in 2009. A disc titled Dragon Quest VII: Eden no Senshitachi on Piano was also released, and contained 27 piano-arranged tracks. The Symphonic Suite was later re-recorded in 2006 along with the rest of the music from the series. An original soundtrack for the 3DS remake was released on March 19, 2014, and features the original recordings by the Tokyo Metropolitan Symphony Orchestra from the remake.

 Manga 

The manga adaptation of Dragon Quest VII was published by Enix's Monthly Gangan in Japan. It was illustrated by Kamui Fujiwara, who also worked on another franchise-related manga, Dragon Quest Retsuden: Roto no Monshō. Fourteen volumes were released between 2001 and 2006, though the series is currently on hiatus. In this adaptation, the hero is given the name "Arus". The manga follows the game story while adding in new characters and more detailed relationships, as the original hero was silent and a personality needed to be added for the comic version.

 Reception Dragon Warrior VII received both commercial and critical success in Japan.  units were sold within 17 days of the game's release; the game established itself for having the largest annual shipment of any independently sold game for the original PlayStation. It was the best-selling PlayStation game of 2000 in the region, having sold more than  copies by November. Shipments of Dragon Quest VII reached four million copies on January 5, 2001, and the game became the sixth best-seller video game of all platforms in Japan at that time. Worldwide, shipments of the game have surpassed 4.1 million units as of March 2003. Dragon Warrior VII won the grand prize in Digital (Interactive) Art Division at the 4th Japan Media Arts Festival in 2000, where the game was praised for being "...engaging without depending on a high degree of realism..." and "...well refined and artfully executed." The game also won four awards from the 5th Japan Entertainment Software Awards by the Computer Entertainment Supplier's Association (CESA), including Best Prize, Scenario Prize, Sales Prize, and Popularity Prize. In 2006, the readers of Famitsu magazine voted Dragon Warrior VII the 9th best video game of all time.

Sales of the North American version of Dragon Warrior VII reached almost 200,000 copies according to The Magic Box, which was not nearly as stellar as its Japanese counterpart. Enix of America still expressed their satisfaction with the sales figures. Dragon Warrior VII met with mostly positive reviews from North American critics. IGN noted that all "100+ hours" of the game are enjoyable despite the dated visuals and clunky presentation. GameZone.com praised the game's concept and nostalgia factor and cited it as "what role-playing games were meant to be." They also noted the game's high difficulty, which, instead of making the game frustrating, they say, "make it that much more of an accomplishment when you complete a quest." IGN described the game's class system as "one of the best class systems seen outside a strategy RPG."

Other critics were not as pleased with Dragon Warrior VII. GameShark.com described the first two hours of the game as "some of the most boring hours you will ever play in a video game." XenGamers.com also pointed out that in order to play the game, the player needs "the patience of a rock". Game Informer even went as far as to say that "four million Japanese can be wrong", referring to the game's immense popularity in Japan. Because of the game's delay in being developed, its release was after the PlayStation 2's release, which created some negative feedback, particularly about the game's graphics. IGN commented on this, calling the game "a game that makes only a bare minimum of concessions to advancing technology, but more than makes up for this with its deep gameplay, massive quest, and sheer variety." GameSpot called the graphics "not good" and warned readers that if the "most rewarding things" they "got out of Final Fantasy VII were the full-motion video interludes, you definitely won't be wowed by anything you see in Dragon Warrior VII."

Eric Bratcher reviewed the PlayStation version of the game for Next Generation'', rating it four stars out of five, and stated that "The harder-core you are, the more you'll love this definitely old-school RPG, but graphics hounds and those with short attention spans can sit this one out."

Sales of the Nintendo 3DS remake exceeded 800,000 copies the first week in Japan. As of March 17, 2013, the remake has sold 1,174,077 copies. Famitsu rated the remake a 35/40, praising the new orchestrated score as well as the improved graphics, intro and first dungeon.

Notes

References

External links 

 
 Official Japanese Dragon Quest VII 3DS website

Role-playing video games
Cancelled 64DD games
Nintendo 3DS eShop games
Nintendo 3DS games
Nintendo games
Nintendo Network games
PlayStation (console) games
Video games about time travel
Dragon Quest video games
Android (operating system) games
IOS games
Video game remakes
2000 video games
Video games adapted into comics
Video games developed in Japan
Video games scored by Koichi Sugiyama